Leviathan is a secret society at Yale University in New Haven, Connecticut that was founded in 2007. In 2014, Leviathan is one of the 41 total secret societies at Yale. Leviathan is named after Thomas Hobbes' 1651 book of the same name.

Like other secret societies at Yale, Leviathan meets twice a week.

See more 

 Collegiate secret societies in North America

References

Secret societies at Yale